Ichthyophis multicolor is a species of caecilians endemic to Burma. It is only known from its type locality in the Ayeyarwady Region. A unique characteristic of this species is that it is the only Ichthyophis species besides I. tricolor that has a pale vent, as well as an adjacent darker stripe running lengthwise down the vent's sides.

References

multicolor
Amphibians described in 2014
Amphibians of Myanmar
Endemic fauna of Myanmar